Nayka Darlyn Benitez Martinez (was born 8 February 1989 in San Juan, Puerto Rico) is a profesional Puerto Rican female volleyball player. 

She is a member of the Puerto Rico women's national volleyball team.
She was part of the Puerto Rican national team at the XXII Juegos Centroamericanos y del Caribe Veracruz 2014, 2015 Pan American Games,  and at the 2015 FIVB World Grand Prix.

She played for Guaynabo 2011, 2012, 2013,2014 and for Ponce 2015, 2016,2017. Also went to Creighton University.

On 2022 she won the Líbero of the year at LVSF (Liga de Voleibol Superior Femenino of Puerto Rico) 

Continuar leyendo: https://blog.abaenglish.com/es/el-vocabulario-del-voleibol-en-ingles/

Clubs 

  Guaynabo Mets
Leonas de Ponce LVSF
Atenienses de Manatí LVSF

References

External links 

 http://worldgrandprix.2015.fivb.com/en/preliminary-round-group2/competition/teams/pur-puerto%20rico/players/naika-benitez?id=44871
 http://www.scoresway.com/?sport=volleyball&page=player&id=11661
 http://image.aausports.org/sports/volleyball/All%20American/AllAmericanslist.pdf
 http://www.fivb.org/viewPressRelease.asp?No=50723&Language=en#.W0I050xFzIU

1988 births
Living people
Expatriate volleyball players in the United States
Puerto Rican women's volleyball players
People from San Juan, Puerto Rico
Volleyball players at the 2015 Pan American Games
Pan American Games competitors for Puerto Rico
Creighton Bluejays women's volleyball players
Liberos